Weekend Players were an electronic music duo from England.  The musicians were vocalist Rachel Foster, who has provided vocals and songwriting on Bent's Ariels album, and producer Andy Cato, one half of Groove Armada.

Biography
The duo hit number one on the US Hot Dance Music/Club Play chart in 2003 with "I'll Be There".  Tracks from their debut album, Pursuit of Happiness, have been featured in numerous episodes of the television series CSI: Crime Scene Investigation and CSI: Miami.

Their biggest UK hits were "21st Century" and "Into the Sun".

Discography

Studio albums

Singles

See also
List of number-one dance hits (United States)
List of artists who reached number one on the US Dance chart

References

English electronic music duos
Downtempo musicians
Trip hop groups
Musical groups established in 2001
Musical groups disestablished in 2004